The GR footpaths are a network of long-distance walking trails in Europe, mostly in France, Belgium, the Netherlands and Spain. Trails are blazed with characteristic marks consisting of a white stripe above a red stripe. These appear regularly along the route, especially at places such as forks or crossroads. 

The network is maintained in France by the Fédération Française de la Randonnée Pédestre (French Hiking Federation), and in Spain by the Federación Española de Deportes de Montaña y Escalada (Spanish Mountain Sports Federation). Many GR routes make up part of the longer European walking routes which cross several countries.

Markings 

The GR trails are marked using a system of blazes that are visible in both directions:
 France, Belgium, Netherlands, and Spain: red and white bars; 3 subtypes
 Luxembourg: yellow rectangles or circles
 Switzerland: red and white bars or yellow diamonds
Red and white was chosen as the most visible colour combination in natural surroundings. Waymarks are often painted, but may take the form of metal signs in city centers.

GR routes

France: Grande Randonnée

Routes 1 to 25

Routes 26 to 40

Routes 41 to 50

Routes 51 to 75

Routes 76 to 100

Routes 101 and above

Routes with special codes

Spain: Gran Recorrido

All routes

Andorra

 GRP (Grande Randonee Pays), a circuit of Andorra
 GRT, a route from Spain to Andorra with two variants
 HRP (High Route Pyrenees), combining elements of the GRP and GRT
 GR 7 passes through Spain, France, and Andorra's Madriu-Perafita-Claror Valley
 GR 11 (Spain) passes through Spain, France, and Andorra's Madriu-Perafita-Claror Valley

Portugal: Percursos Pedestres de Grande Rota
GR 5 Fojos circular, Vieira do Minho / Minho
GR 11-E9 Caminho de Santiago, international, linear
GR 12-E7 international, linear
GR 13-E4 Via Algarviana, international, linear, 
GR 14 Rota dos Vinhos da Europa, international, linear,
GR 17 Travessia do Alto Coura, circular, 
GR 22 Rota das Aldeias Históricas, circular, 
GR 23 Serra do Caldeirão, circular, 
GR 26 Terras de Sicó, circular, 9 stages, 
GR 28 Por Montes e Vales de Arouca, circular, 
GR 29 Rota dos Veados, circular, 
GR 30 Grande Rota das Linhas de Torres, circular, Lisboan and Vale do Tejo
GR 45 Grande Rota do Côa, linear
GR 117 Geira Romana, international, linear
Travessia do Alvão, circular, 
Travessia da Ribeira Minho, linear, 
Soajo Peneda, circular,

Belgium: Grote Routepaden or Grande Randonnée

Netherlands: Langeafstandswandelpaden

See also
European long-distance paths
Metropolitan trail

References

External links

 List of grande randonnée hiking trails in France and Belgium
 List of multi-day GR itineraries in France (mostly in French)
 Fédération Française de la Randonnée Pédestre
 Website with Belgian GR routes
 Federacion espanola de deportes de montaña y escalada FEDME page on GRs in Spain
 Federació d'Entitats Excursionistes de Catalunya FEEC, page on GRs in Catalonia
 Grote Routepaden in Belgium
Map of GR paths in Belgium

A